Group 42 was a Czech artistic group officially established in 1942 (although its roots date to 1938–1939, forming in 1940).  The group's activity ceased in 1948, but its influence on Czech literature and Czech art was still evident in further years.

This group was mainly influenced by civilism, cubism, futurism, constructivism, and a bit by surrealism. Their work revealed a characteristic fascination with technology, evident in their frequent focus on cities, factories, industry, and machines. The human characters are generally common townspeople.

The article The World We Live In (Czech Svět, v němž žijeme) by Jindřich Chalupecký provided Group 42's primary theoretical foundation.

Members

Poets
Ivan Blatný
Jan Hanč
Jiřina Hauková
Josef Kainar
Jiří Kolář (also a visual artist)

Painters
František Gross
František Hudeček
Jan Kotík
Kamil Lhoták
Bohumír Matal
Jan Smetana
Karel Souček

Carver
Ladislav Zívr

Photographer
Miroslav Hák

Theoreticians
Jindřich Chalupecký
Jiří Kotalík

References
Eva Petrová (ed.) and collective: Skupina 42, Akropolis, Praha 1998,  
Zdeněk Pešat, Eva Petrová (ed.): Skupina 42, Atlantis, Brno 2000,  
Izabela Mroczek: Dom, ulica, miasto w poezji czeskiej Grupy 42, Śląsk, Katowice-Warszawa,  2005 (Polish)
Leszek Engelking: Codzienność i mit. Poetyka, programy i historia Grupy 42 w kontekstach dwudziestowiecznej awangardy i postawangardy, Wydawnictwo Uniwersytetu Łódzkiego, Łódź 2005,  (Polish)

External links
Avant-gardists – A pair of art rebels step into the mainstream, Naomi Lindt, 8.3.2006, The Prague Post
Legendární Skupina 42, (Josef Fronc), Zpravodaj 2/2005 
České diskontinuity, an interview with Jiří Kotalík at the jedinak.cz  
Example photos of book Skupina 42 

 
Czech literature
Literary societies